

This is a list of the National Register of Historic Places listings in Rock Island County, Illinois.

This is intended to be a complete list of the properties and districts on the National Register of Historic Places in Rock Island County, Illinois, United States. Latitude and longitude coordinates are provided for many National Register properties and districts; these locations may be seen together in a map.

There are 27 properties and districts listed on the National Register in the county, including 1 National Historic Landmark.  Another five properties were once listed, but have since been removed.

Current listings

|}

Former listings

|}

See also
 
 List of National Historic Landmarks in Illinois
 National Register of Historic Places listings in Illinois

References

External links
Rock Island Historic Structures Inventory

Rock Island